Ljupka is a Croatian and Macedonian female given name

Those with the name include:

Ljupka Dimitrovska (1946–2016), Croatian-Macedonian singer
Ljupka Gojić (born 1982), Croatian model and the face of Givenchy
Ljupka Džundeva (born 1934), Macedonian film and theater actress

Croatian feminine given names